Orya may refer to:

 Orya (play), an ancient Greek comedy by Epicharmus
 Orya (centipede), a genus of centipedes
 Orya language, a language of West Papua, Indonesia (not to be confused with the Oriya language of India)
 Orya,  ISO 15924 code for the Odia alphabet of India

People with the name 
 Orya Maqbool Jan, Pakistani columnist
 Roberts Orya, Nigerian banker

See also 
 Oriya (disambiguation), topics related to Orissa, India
 Oria (disambiguation)